The Havøysund Bridge is the world's northernmost bridge over 50 meter length. It is a prestressed concrete cantilever bridge in Måsøy Municipality in Troms og Finnmark county, Norway. The bridge crosses the Havøysundet strait connecting the mainland to the fishing village of Havøysund on the island of Havøya. The Havøysund Bridge was opened in 1986 and is part of County Road 889.

See also
List of bridges in Norway
List of bridges in Norway by length
List of bridges
List of bridges by length

References

External links

A picture of Havøysund Bridge

Bridges completed in 1986
Road bridges in Troms og Finnmark
Måsøy
1986 establishments in Norway